Jason Courtney Ralph (28 June 1872 – 6 February 1952) was an Australian rules footballer who played with South Melbourne in the Victorian Football League (VFL).

Notes

External links 

1872 births
1952 deaths
Australian rules footballers from Victoria (Australia)
Sydney Swans players